Beauvau may refer to:

Places
Beauvau, Maine-et-Loire, France
Place Beauvau, site of the Ministry of the Interior in Paris

Names
House of Beauvau, a historic noble family from Anjou
 Marc de Beauvau, Prince of Craon (1679–1754), viceroy, administrator of the Grand Duchy of Tuscany
 Marie Françoise Catherine de Beauvau-Craon (1711–1787), marquise de Boufflers, mistress of King Stanislas I
 Charles Juste de Beauvau, Prince of Craon (1720–1793), marshal of France

French-language surnames